Sampler is a compilation album by the English rock band Cardiacs, released in 1995.

The album was intended as a budget introduction to the band's music, and was released as part of the general 1995 reissue of the Cardiacs back catalogue. Each track is taken from a different album in the reissue series. Most of the tracks are performed by Cardiacs, but the album also features two tracks performed by Cardiacs spin-off projects: The Sea Nymphs ("Christ Alive") and Tim Smith's Extra Special OceanLandWorld ("Veronica In Ecstasy"). Sampler features two of Cardiacs' singles/lead tracks - the charting version of "Is This The Life?" and a live version of the title track from the "Big Ship" mini-album.

Track listing
 "Is This The Life?"
 "Angelworm Angel"
 "Burn Your House Brown"
 "Goodbye Grace"
 "Piffol Four Times"
 "Two Bites Of Cherry" (Live)
 "Tarred And Feathered" (Live)
 "Blind In Safety And Leafy In Love"
 "Big Ship" (Live)
 "Veronica In Ecstasy"
 "Christ Alive"
 "The Everso Closely Guarded Line"
 "To Go Off And Things"

Lineup
Everybody who's ever been in Cardiacs, with the exception of Ralph Cade and Peter Tagg.

Cardiacs compilation albums
Sampler albums
1995 compilation albums